The 1905 Nobel Prize in Literature was awarded to the Polish novelist Henryk Sienkiewicz (1846–1916) "because of his outstanding merits as an epic writer." He was given the prize on 10 December 1905. He is the first Polish author to win the Nobel Prize in the literary category and the second Polish citizen to win in general after the chemist Maria Skłodowska Curie in 1903. He was followed by Władysław Reymont in 1924.

Laureate

Henryk Sienkiewicz is best known for his epic historical novels. He began writing them during the 1880s and published them as serial installments in Polish newspapers. Comprehensive historical studies formed as the basis for his great trilogy of Polish life during the mid-17th century: Ogniem i mieczem ("With Fire and Sword", 1884), Potop ("The Deluge", 1886) and Wołodyjowski ("Fire in the Steppe", 1888). The trilogy intertwines facts, fiction and a strong patriotic undertone. His best-known novel is Quo Vadis (1895), a story of St. Peter in Rome in the reign of Emperor Nero.

Deliberations

Nominations
Sienkiewicz was first nominated in 1901. Since then he has been annually nominated by literary scholars and academic for his epic oeuvres. In 1905, he was nominated by Hans Hildebrand, an archeologist and member of the Swedish Academy. 

In total, the academy received 35 nominations for 15 individuals such as the Russian novelist Leo Tolstoy, British poet Algernon Charles Swinburne and writer Rudyard Kipling (awarded in 1907), Czech poet Jaroslav Vrchlický, French historian Albert Sorel, and British essayist John Morley. Two of the nominees were women, Polish novelist Eliza Orzeszkowa and Swedish author Selma Lagerlöf (awarded in 1909). John Macmillan Brown, a Scottish-New Zealand academic, administrator and promoter of education for women, nominated himself under the pseudonym Godfrey Sweven.

The authors Alphonse Allais, Rudolf Baumbach, Victor Daley, Julius de Geyter, José-Maria de Heredia, Otto Erich Hartleben, Hermann Lingg, Mirra Lokhvitskaya, George MacDonald, Paul Meurice, Balduin Möllhausen, Vjenceslav Novak, Manuel Reina Montilla, William Sharp, Amalie Skram, Julius Stinde, Debendranath Tagore, Juan Valera y Alcalá-Galiano, Jules Verne, and Lew Wallace died in 1905 without having been nominated for the prize.

Reactions
It is often incorrectly asserted that Sienkiewicz received his Nobel Prize for Quo Vadis. While Quo Vadis is the novel that brought him international fame, the Nobel Prize does not name any particular novel, instead citing "his outstanding merits as an epic writer". In his acceptance speech, he said this honor was of particular value to a son of Poland: "She was pronounced dead – yet here is proof that she lives on... She was pronounced defeated – and here is proof that she is victorious."

According to Burton Feldman, the Nobel judges needed only nine years to honur Sienkiewicz for his Quo Vadis – "displacing Tolstoy," claimed a Nobel evaluator. Sienkiewicz's Quo Vadis appeared in 1896 and over the next few decades sold millions of copies. The Nobel judges have often been greatly impressed by the international popularity of a writer and was awarded thereafter.

Notes

References

External links
Award ceremony speech by C.D. af Wirsén nobelprize.org

1905
Henryk Sienkiewicz